Bonting Island is an island located on Sandakan in Sabah, Malaysia.

See also
 List of islands of Malaysia

External links 

Islands of Sabah